Emmanouil Miaoulis (1812 - 1871) was a Greek naval officer.  He was born in  the island of Hydra in 1812, the son of Andreas Vokos Miaoulis, who became the leader of the Greek navies in the Greek War of Independence. As a member of the renowned Hydriot Miaoulis family, a naval career came naturally to him. He was enrolled into the Royal Hellenic Navy and achieved the rank of Captain, and the post of commander of the Poros Naval Base. He died in 1871. The painter Nikolaos Vokos was his son.

1812 births
1871 deaths
Hellenic Navy officers
Emmanouil
19th-century Greek military personnel
People from Hydra (island)